Tobian Tools, also known as Indo G (born c. 1973 ) is an American rapper from Memphis, Tennessee. First hitting the Memphis rap scene with fellow Memphian, Lil' Blunt, in the mid-1990s, they released two albums on Luke Records, Up In Smoke (1995) and The Antidote (1995).  Soon after, Indo G became affiliated with Three 6 Mafia and released Angel Dust in 1998.  However, the relationship between Three 6 and Indo deteriorated, and they no longer work together.

Discography

Studio albums
 Angel Dust (1998)
 Christmas N' Memphis (2002)
 Kill the Noise (2006)
 Purple Drank (2007)

Collaboration albums
 The Antidote with Lil' Blunt (1994)
 19 Nigga 4 with Lil' Blunt (1994)
 Up in Smoke with Lil' Blunt (1995)
 Live and Learn with The Ghetto Troopers (2000)
 Contact with Lil' Blunt (2002)

Compilation albums
 Down South Ballin''' (1997)

Extended plays
 Crossfire with Lil' Blunt (1992)

Singles
 "Blame It on the Funk" with Lil' Blunt (1994)
 "Remember Me Ballin'" featuring Gangsta Boo (1998)
 "Giddy Up" (Tommy Boy Records Promo) (2001)

Soundtrack appearances
 "Giddy Up" (Remix Promo) (from Kung Faux'') (2001)

See also
 Three 6 Mafia

References

External links
 Indo G on Myspace
 Indo G on Discogs
 
 

1973 births
African-American crunk musicians
African-American male rappers
Gangsta rappers
Living people
Prophet Entertainment
Rappers from Memphis, Tennessee
Southern hip hop musicians
21st-century American rappers
21st-century American male musicians
21st-century African-American musicians
20th-century African-American people